The Old Man is an American drama thriller television series based on the 2017 novel The Old Man by Thomas Perry. It was developed by Jonathan E. Steinberg and Robert Levine and premiered on FX on June 16, 2022. The first season consists of seven episodes. Following its premiere, the series was renewed for a second season.

Premise
Dan Chase (Jeff Bridges) is a former CIA operative and Vietnam veteran who has been living off-the-grid in Vermont for thirty years. After killing an intruder who breaks into his home, Chase goes into hiding. He rents a room from Zoe McDonald (Amy Brenneman), who becomes his forced partner while on the run.

FBI Assistant Director for Counterintelligence Harold Harper (John Lithgow) is called to apprehend Chase because of their complicated past during the Soviet–Afghan War. Working alongside Harper are his protégés: FBI agent Angela Adams (Alia Shawkat); CIA officer Raymond Waters (E. J. Bonilla); and Julian Carson (Gbenga Akinnagbe), a hit-man hired by Harper to kill Chase.

Cast

Main
 Jeff Bridges as Dan Chase / Henry Dixon / Johnny Kohler / Peter
 John Lithgow as Harold Harper
 E. J. Bonilla as Raymond Waters
 Bill Heck as young Johnny Kohler / Dan Chase
 Leem Lubany as young Belour Hamzad (née Daadfar)
 Alia Shawkat as Angela Adams / Emily Chase
 Gbenga Akinnagbe as Julian Carson 
 Amy Brenneman as Zoe McDonald

Recurring
 Hiam Abbass as Belour Hamzad (née Daadfar) / Abbey Chase
 Kenneth Mitchell as Joe
 Joel Grey as Morgan Bote
 Pej Vahdat as young Faraz Hamzad
 Noor Razooky as young Kaftar
 Echo Kellum as Mike
 Jessica Harper as Cheryl Harper
 Rowena King as Nina Kruger

Guest
 Christopher Redman as young Harold Harper
 Jessica Parker Kennedy as Woman at Bus Stop
 Faran Tahir as Rahmani
 Rade Serbedzija as Old Suleyman Pavlovic
 Jacqueline Antaramian as Old Woman
 Navid Negahban as Faraz Hamzad

Episodes

Production
The series was announced in July 2019, with FX ordering a pilot with Jeff Bridges cast to star. In September, Jon Watts was set to direct the pilot and be an executive producer, with John Lithgow and Amy Brenneman added to the cast. Alia Shawkat joined in October. In November, Bob Iger announced that the show would air on FX on Hulu, and Austin Stowell was added to play a younger version of Chase. In February 2020, Kenneth Mitchell disclosed he had a role in the series. Stowell would be recast in March 2020 with Bill Heck, and Gbenga Akinnagbe, Leem Lubany, and E. J. Bonilla were cast in main roles. Navid Negahban and Pej Vahdat were cast in recurring roles in December 2020.

Shooting the series was two-thirds complete when production shut down in mid-March 2020 due to the COVID-19 pandemic. Production resumed in late 2020 with three episodes remaining to film, but was soon halted when Bridges was diagnosed with lymphoma in October 2020 and departed for cancer treatment. The show stayed in production for a short period after his diagnosis to shoot scenes from the remaining episodes that do not feature his character. In September 2021, he announced his cancer was in remission. Production ultimately resumed in February 2022. On June 27, 2022, the series was renewed for a second season.

Release 
The series premiered on June 16, 2022, on FX in the United States and Canada. It was also premiered on Disney+ (Star) on July 13, 2022, in Australia and New Zealand and Star+ in Latin America.

Reception

Critical response
The review aggregator website Rotten Tomatoes reported a 97% approval rating with an average rating of 7.4/10, based on 59 critic reviews. The website's critics consensus reads, "The Old Man is just as intrepid and spiky—and derivative—as younger action heroes, with Jeff Bridges lending invaluable gravitas to this bone-crunching thriller." Metacritic, which uses a weighted average, assigned a score of 72 out of 100 based on 25 critics, indicating "generally favorable reviews."

Ratings

Streaming viewership 
According to the streaming aggregator Reelgood, The Old Man was the most watched program across all platforms, during the week of June 24, 2022, the week of June 29, 2022, and the week of July 2, 2022. According to the streaming aggregator JustWatch, it was the most streamed television series across all platforms in the United States, between June 1, 2022, and 30, 2022, and during the week ending July 3, 2022, and the third during the week ending July 17, 2022.

Accolades

References

Notes

External links

2022 American television series debuts
2020s American drama television series
American action television series
American thriller television series
English-language television shows
FX Networks original programming
Soviet–Afghan War fiction
Television productions suspended due to the COVID-19 pandemic
Television series about the Central Intelligence Agency
Television series about the Federal Bureau of Investigation
Television series about old age
Television series by 20th Century Fox Television
Television shows based on American novels
Television shows set in New York (state)